Gat Pangil was a legendary Tagalog ruler whom legends say ruled in the area now known as Laguna Province, Philippines. 

Pangil plays a part in the town founding myths for the municipalities of Bay, Laguna, Pangil, Laguna, Pakil, Laguna and Mauban, Quezon, – all of which are said to have been part of his dominions.

References

Filipino datus, rajas and sultans
People from Laguna (province)